Fremantle Grammar School is a defunct school and heritage-listed building in Fremantle, Western Australia.

Architecture
The building stands at 200 High Street, opposite Monument Hill. It was built by Melbourne architect Charles Inksep in the Gothic Revival style, from limestone and corrugated asbestos.

History
The school was established as a public school by the Anglican church in 1885.  Henry Briggs was sent from England to help establish it, and was its head-master until 1897. The grammar school closed in 1905 and that was put down to the headmaster (later Sir Henry Briggs) interest in politics.

In the 1920s, the building became a short-lived girls' school named Girton College, and in 1945 was bought by The Reorganised Church of Jesus Christ of Latter-day Saints (now known as Community of Christ) for use as a place of worship until 1988.

It is currently in private ownership, and the condition of the building has been allowed to decline.  There are large cracks in some of the walls and in January 2011, the owner was fined $2574 for removing the bell tower.

References

Further reading
 Fremantle School.(1895) Aims, objects, curriculum, rules and nominal rolls of scholars of Fremantle Grammar School 1882-1888 and Fremantle School 1888-1895 Perth [W.A.] : Sands & McDougall print. Held in Battye Library

Defunct schools in Western Australia
Heritage places in Fremantle
Educational institutions established in 1885
High Street, Fremantle
1885 establishments in Australia
Educational institutions disestablished in 1905
1905 disestablishments in Australia
State Register of Heritage Places in the City of Fremantle